Papilio thoas, the king swallowtail or Thoas swallowtail, is a butterfly of the family Papilionidae. It is found in the southernmost United States, Mexico, Central America and South America (as far south as Argentina and Uruguay). The species is easily confused with the giant swallowtail, which it closely resembles in both larval and adult stages.  The caterpillars feed on the leaves of citrus plants (Rutaceae). They have also been reported as feeding on a member of the genus Piper.

Adult Thoas swallowtails fly year round in the tropics, feeding on nectar of a variety of flowers, including Lantana, Stachytarpheta, and Bougainvillea among other species.  The wingspan is 100–130 mm.

Subspecies
Listed alphabetically.
P. t. autocles Rothschild & Jordan, 1906
P. t. brasiliensis Rothschild & Jordan, 1906
P. t. cynrias Ménétriés, 1857
P. t. nealces Rothschild & Jordan, 1906
P. t. oviedo Gundlach, 1866
P. t. thoantiades Burmeister, 1878
P. t. thoas Linnaeus, 1771

References

External links

 Thoas Swallowtail, Butterflies and Moths of North America
 

thoas
Butterflies described in 1771
Butterflies of North America
Butterflies of Central America
Butterflies of the Caribbean
Papilionidae of South America
Butterflies of Cuba
Taxa named by Carl Linnaeus